The Lynching of Jake Brooks occurred in Oklahoma City, Oklahoma on January 14, 1922.

Background

In 1922, the meatpackers Union in Oklahoma City was on strike. Militant strikers were angered by scab workers taking their jobs and plotted to make an example.

Lynching
The militants went to great lengths and even recruited Jake Brooks' own cousin to take part in the lynching. They abducted him from his home on Saturday, January 14, 1922, drove him 5  out of Oklahoma City and hung him from a tree. It took three days for his body to be discovered.

Aftermath

The local police were initially hesitant to investigate the killing but Governor James B.A. Robertson directly intervened and five "ringleaders" were arrested, charged, pleaded guilty and were sentenced. They were Lee Whitley, 29; Charles Polk, 18; Elmert Yearta, 19; (the three white accused) and Robert Allen, 27; Nathan Butler, 40 (the two Black accused). Photographs of Jake Brooks's hanged body are sent to Congress, hoping for passage of the Dyer Anti-Lynching Bill. 

The Dyer Anti-Lynching Bill was first introduced in 1918 by Representative Leonidas C. Dyer, a Republican from St. Louis, Missouri, in the United States House of Representatives as H.R. 11279. It was intended to establish lynching as a federal crime. The Dyer Anti-Lynching Bill was re-introduced in subsequent sessions of Congress and passed, 230 to 119, by the U.S. House of Representatives on January 26, 1922, but its passage was halted in the Senate by a filibuster by Southern Democrats, who formed a powerful block. Southern Democrats justified their opposition to the bill by arguing that lynchings were a response to rapes and proclaiming that lynchings were an issue that should be left for states to deal with. 

Attempts to pass similar legislation took a halt until the Costigan-Wagner Bill of 1934. It was not until 2018 that the Senate passed the anti-lynching legislation Justice for Victims of Lynching Act, on which the House of Representatives took no action. On February 26, 2020, the House passed a revised version, the Emmett Till Antilynching Act, by a vote of 410–4. A revised version of the bill that includes a serious bodily injury standard was passed by the 117th Congress, and was signed into law by President Joe Biden on March 29, 2022.

Bibliography 
Notes

References 

 

 - Total pages:920

1921 riots
1921 in Oklahoma
African-American history of Oklahoma
Lynching deaths in Oklahoma 
December 1921 events
Protest-related deaths
Racially motivated violence against African Americans 
Riots and civil disorder in Oklahoma 
White American riots in the United States